Fradd is a surname. Notable people with the surname include:

Elizabeth Fradd, British nursing administrator
Robbie Fradd (born 1964), South African jockey